Dale Wood was a renowned composer, organist, and choral director best known for his church music compositions. He was born on February 13, 1934, in Glendale, California, and died April 13, 2003. Wood began writing compositions at a young age.  When he was 13 years old, he won a national hymn-writing contest for the American Lutheran Church.

Achievements
 Contributing editor to the Journal of Church Music
 Headed the publication committee of the Choristers Guild from 1970 to 1974
 Music director at the Grace Cathedral School for Boys in San Francisco from 1973–1974
 Editor for The Sacred Music Press from 1975–1996
 Editor emeritus of The Sacred Music Press from 1996–2001
 Exemplar Medallion from California Lutheran University in 1993

Bibliography

References

External links
 Dale Wood website

1934 births
2003 deaths
20th-century American composers
20th-century hymnwriters
Musicians from Glendale, California
Writers from Glendale, California